"Truth About You" is a song by American country music singer Mitchell Tenpenny. It was released on July 9, 2021 as the lead single from his second studio album This Is the Heavy. Tenpenny co-wrote the song with Matt Alderman and Thomas Archer, and produced it with Jordan Schmidt.

Background
Tenpenny first revealed the song on TikTok in July 2021. The song went on to gain over 2.5 million streams in the first three days. He stated in a press release: "I have the best and most reactive fans. Their instantaneous feedback is invaluable to me as an artist. There is nothing more gratifying than making music for them."

Content
In a radio interview with Taste of Country Nights, Tenpenny stated that the song is about an "ex-[girlfriend]", "experiences his friends have gone through" and his "own bad behavior in relationships".

Music video
The music video was released on September 1, 2021, and directed by Dustin Haney. It was filmed at Bobby’s Idle Hour bar and Warren Studios in Nashville, Tennessee.

Charts

Weekly charts

Year-end charts

Certifications

Release history

References

2021 singles
2021 songs
Mitchell Tenpenny songs
Columbia Nashville Records singles